Sciola is an unincorporated community in Montgomery County, Iowa, United States.

History
Sciola's population was 27 in 1902.

References

Unincorporated communities in Montgomery County, Iowa
Unincorporated communities in Iowa